Asisite (Pb7SiO8Cl2) is a yellow tetragonal mineral. It is found at Kombat Mine, Kombat, Grootfontein District, Otjozondjupa Region, Namibia. It was named for a farm, Asis, which covers the mine where it was found. It was discovered in 1988.

References
Mindat.org - Asisite 
Webmineral.com - Asisite
Handbook of Mineralogy - Asisite

Lead minerals
Halide minerals